Inuit Nunangat (lit. "lands, waters and ices of the [Inuit] people") is the homeland of the Inuit in Canada. This Arctic homeland consists of four northern Canadian regions called the Inuvialuit Settlement Region (Inuvialuit Nunangat, home of the Inuvialuit and the northern portion of the Northwest Territories), the territory Nunavut, Nunavik in northern Québec, and Nunatsiavut of Newfoundland and Labrador.

Etymology

Originally using the Greenlandic term "Nunaat" excluding the waters and ices, Inuit of Canada formally switched to the Inuktitut "Nunangat" in 2009 to reflect the integral nature "lands, waters and ices" have to Inuit culture.

History

Inuit settlement
Aside from Métis, Inuit are the most recent Indigenous arrivals on the continent.

Inuit ancestors known as the Thule settled the Arctic replacing the previous dominant Dorset culture (Tuniit). The last remnant of Tuniit were Sadlermiut who disappeared in the early 1900s.

Inuit replaced the local Dorset culture over the course of around 200 years in the first millennium CE.

Displacement of the Tuniit , or the Dorset people, and the arrival of the Inuit (whose ancestors are often called Thule) occurred in the 1100-1300s CE. Coming from Siberia where they split from the Aleut and other related peoples about 4,000 years ago, Inuit had reached Inughuit Nunaat in western Greenland by about 1300 CE, bringing with them transport dogs and various new technologies.

Trade relations were and remain strong with bordering countries and nations, such as with the Gwich'in and Chipewyan (Dënesųłı̨né) of Denendeh and Innu of Nitassinan , though occasional conflicts arose. Trade and relations with Europeans began with sparse Norse–Inuit contact and Basque trade with the southern NunatuKavummuit of NunatuKavut and the Nunatsiavummuit. Martin Frobisher's 1576 expedition to find the Northwest Passage landed on and around Baffin Island, in today's Qikiqtaaluk Region , where three Inuit, a man called Calichough (Kalicho), a woman, Egnock (Arnaq), and her child, Nutioc (Nuttaaq), were kidnapped and brought to the European continent, where they all died.

The first treaty signed between Inuit and the Crown was in 1765 where NunatuKavut held negotiations over land use rights in Labrador. Around the same time, the Moravian Church set up missions supported by the English after altercations between NunatuKavut and colonial governments, with NunatuKavummuit's raids on whaling outposts ended by both treaties and the beginnings of harsh church control.

Canadian colonisation
Canadian colonisation extended in to Inuit Nunangat via the lands claimed as Rupert's Land, North-Western Territory and Québec, later including Newfoundland and Labrador. Rapid spread of diseases, material wealth, the Christian churches and Canadian (RCMP) policing saw a rapid decline and collapse of Inuit Nunangat, from which it is still recovering.

Since European colonisers had little desire to settle much of Inuit Nunangat's territories, the violence experienced by southern First Nations was comparatively minimal in the North. However, assimilation policies including the wide-scale slaughter of community dogs between 1950 and 1970, the High Arctic relocation as well as forced participation within the Canadian Indian residential school system has left Inuit society with language loss and intergenerational trauma.

Modern era
Today, Inuit Nunangat is overseen by the Inuit Tapiriit Kanatami (meaning either "Inuit are united with Canada" or "Inuit are united in Canada") which acts as a cultural centre piece and quasi-central government for Inuit affairs within Canada.

While Nunavut's confederation within Canada in 1999 via the Nunavut Act and Nunavut Land Claims Agreement is most visible, each of the regions of Inuit Nunangat as well as NunatuKavut have land claims with Canada. Nunangit came under the jurisdiction of the Inuvialuit Regional Corporation two years after the 1984 Inuvialuit Final Agreement, and Nunatsiavut was granted an autonomous government in 2005 after the 2002 Labrador Inuit Association proposal for a separate government. Beginning with a land claim in 1977, negotiations launched in 1988 between the Labrador Inuit Association, the governments of Newfoundland and Labrador and that of Canada. In Northern Québec, the Makivik Corporation was established upon the James Bay and Northern Québec Agreement signing in 1978, taking the mantle from the previous Nunavimmiut "Northern Québec Inuit Association".

Finally, not formally within Inuit Nunangat is NunatuKavut whose treaty with the British extends back to 1765 and remains in force, with the NunatuKavut Community Council (NCC) overseeing governance in this region.

The Inuit-Crown Partnership Committee (ICPC) was created in 2017 and last met on April 21, 2022. At this meeting, the Canadian federal government, in partnership with the Inuit Nunangat, unanimously endorsed the federal policy called the Inuit Nunangat Policy (INP). In a live address shortly after this meeting, the Canadian Prime Minister, Justin Trudeau, said the policy "recognizes the Inuit homeland as a distinct geographical, cultural and political region," which includes the "land, sea, and ice."

Demographics

As of the 2016 Canadian Census the population of Inuit Nunangat was 56,585. The Indigenous population is 49,020 or 86.63% of the total population, of which 47,335 (83.65%) are Inuit.

Of those Inuit living in Inuit Nunangat 6.57% live in the Inuvialuit Settlement Region, 63.66% in Nunavut, 24.93% in Nunavik and  4.84% in Nunatsiavut. In total there are 65,025 Inuit in Canada with 47, 335 (72.80%) living in Inuit Nunangat and 17,695 (27.21%) living in other parts of Canada.

Communities

Inuvik is the regional centre for the Inuvik Region in the Northwest Territories and serves as a regional seat for the Inuvialuit Settlement Region. Iqaluit is the capital of Nunavut and Kuujjuaq for Nunavik. For Nunatsiavut, Hopedale (population 574) is the legislative capital and Nain (population 1,125) is the administrative capital.

There are six communities in the Inuvialuit Settlement Region, one town, Inuvik and five hamlets, Aklavik, Paulatuk, Sachs Harbour, Tuktoyaktuk and Ulukhaktok.

There are twenty-five populated communities in Nunavut. One city, Iqaluit and twenty-four hamlets, Arctic Bay, Arviat, Baker Lake, Cambridge Bay, Cape Dorset, Chesterfield Inlet, Clyde River, Coral Harbour, Gjoa Haven, Grise Fiord, Hall Beach, Igloolik, Kimmirut, Kugaaruk, Kugluktuk, Naujaat, Pangnirtung, Pond Inlet, Qikiqtarjuaq, Rankin Inlet, Resolute, Sanikiluaq, Taloyoak and Whale Cove. In addition there is one uninhabited community recognised by the Government of Nunavut, Bathurst Inlet. Statistics Canada also recognises the uninhabited communities of Nanisivik and Umingmaktok.

There are fourteen villages in Nunavik, Akulivik, Aupaluk, Inukjuak, Ivujivik, Kangiqsualujjuaq, Kangiqsujuaq, Kangirsuk, Kuujjuaq, Kuujjuarapik, Puvirnituq, Quaqtaq, Salluit, Tasiujaq and Umiujaq. All of these are northern village municipalities (TN) (Municipalité de village nordique) and, with the exception of Ivujivik and Puvirnituq, all have reserved lands associated.

There are five towns in Nunatsiavut, Hopedale, Makkovik, Nain, Postville and Rigolet.

Languages
There are multiple languages spoken across Inuit Nunangat. The oral languages form a vast dialect continuum with mutual intelligibility between neighbouring variants from the westernmost Iñupiatun dialect to the three Greenlandic languages: Kalaallisut, Tunumiisut, and, the closest variation to Canadian dialects, Inuktun. In Canada, there is Inuvialuktun spoken in the West in Inuvialuit Nunangat; Inuktitut, the most spoken dialect; Inuinnaqtun which straddles the line between Inuktitut and Inuvialuktun; and Inuttitut spoken in the Labradorian East by Nunatsiavummiut. And, attested contemporarily only in a few Nunavut communities, Inuit Sign Language (also known as Atgangmuurngniq and Uukturausingit) continues to be passed down through generations regardless of deafness. It is unknown by academia if there is any relation between Greenlandic and Inuit Sign Languages or if Greenlandic Sign Language is a dialect of Danish Tegnsprog.

Within each of the primary oral language divisions (Inuvialuktun, Inuktut, and Inuttut), there exist several dialects therein. Within Inuvialuktun, the Siglit who live at the mouth of the Kuukpak speak Siglitun; and the Uummarmiut, or "people of the green trees" and are sometimes called "Canadian Iñupiaq," speak Uummarmiutun. Western Inuktut dialects are sometimes considered Inuvialuktun dialects, such as Inuinnaqtun (including one of its subdialects, Kangiryuarmiutun, spoken by the Copper Inuit group, the Kangiryuarmiut). Others include Natsilingmiutut, spoken by the Netsilik, with its sub-dialects including Utkuhiksalingmiutitut (the language of the "people of the place where there is soapstone": Utkuhiksalingmiut); Kivallirmiutut spoken by the Caribou Inuit of the Kivalliq Region; Aivilingmiutut of the Aivilingmiut; and the northern Qikiqtaaluk uannangani spoken by Iglulingmiut. On the southern part of Qikiqtaaluk around the Nunavut capital Iqaluit, Qikiqtaaluk nigiani is spoken, and relatively close is the dialect of Nunavik, Nunavimmiutitut, sometimes called Tarramiutut, Taqramiutut, or Inuttitut (not to be confused with Nunatsiavummiutut of Labrador). Nunavimmiutitut includes the subdialects spoken by the Tarrarmiut and Itivimuit. Nunatsiavummiut in Nunatsiavut, Labrador speak Inuttitut, Inuttut, or, alternatively, Labradorimiutut.

People

Inuit are diverse peoples who share cultural and linguistic similarities. Moreover, they are a bimodal people, speaking both oral languages (Inuktut) and sign languages (Atgangmuurniq).

Peoples of Inuit Nunangat

 Nunavummiut
 Kivallirmiut
 Nunavimmiut
 Inuvialuit
 Nunatsiavummiut / Labradorimiut

Inuit outside Nunangat

 NunatuKavummuit
 Kalaallit
 Inughuit
 Tunumiit
 Iñupiaq

Related peoples

 Yup'ik
 Sugpiaq
 Aleut

Geography

Spanning much of the North American Arctic, Inuit Nunangat is mostly above the tree line.

Climate change
Inuit Tapiriit Kanatami released in 2019 their National Inuit Climate Change Strategy to combat and respond to the ecological collapse and its effects on Inuit and Inuit Nunangat.

Culture

Inuit culture transcends millennia and includes numerous music styles, sports and other cultural attributes.

Inuit Nunangat has produced numerous contemporary bands and singers, such as Joshua Haulli, Quantum Tangle, The Jerry Cans ᐸᐃ ᒑᓚᖃᐅᑎᒃᑯᑦ (Pai Gaalaqautikkut), Elisapie ᐃᓕᓴᐱ, Aasiva, Tanya Tagaq, Riit ᕇᑦ, Qaunak Mikkigak, and Tumasi Quissa, as well as many others. Yearly, the Alianait Music and Arts Festival features talented acts from across Inuit Nunangat, Canada, and the world, as one of many festivals that take place.

Inuit are world-renown for their use of soapstone, such as for carvings and for making qulliq ᖁᓪᓕᖅ. Although power tools are used, soapstone carving is often preferably done by axe and file.

The modern kayak originates from Inuit culture, originally called a qajaq ᖃᔭᖅ. As well, Inuit use the larger (6–12 m), wood-framed flat-bottomed umiaq for transporting people, goods, and dogs; and, on land, qamutik pulled by huskies or qimmiit, though Inuit have since transitioned to motorized forms of transport such as the Ski-Doo for navigating since the Canadian government massacred most of their sled dogs between the 1950s and 1970s in order to assimilate Inuit out of their traditional ways of life.

Inuit cuisine, also known as "country food," incorporates a variety of meats (such as walrus, narwhal, bearded seal, caribou, polar bear, Arctic cod, and Arctic char, amongst others) and gathered plants (including crowberries, cloudberries, fireweed, seaweed, tubers and roots like mousefood, tuberous spring beauty, and sweet vetch) Much of the meat is served frozen, raw, or boiled, much like sushi or sashimi in Japanese cuisine. Delicacies include akutuq ᐊᑯᑐᖅ, an ice cream-like dessert made with fat or tallow, meat, and mixed with berries; igunaq ᐃᒍᓇᖅ, a year-long fermentation of select meats; maktaaq ᒪᒃᑖᖅ (alternatively maktak ᒪᒃᑕᒃ or maktaq), frozen whale skin and blubber usually eaten raw, sometimes pickled, and occasionally finely diced, breaded, deep fried, and then served with soy sauce; Labrador tea; and various dips such as aalu ᐋᓗ (intended for meat made from the choice parts of caribou or seal, chopped into tiny pieces and blended with melted fat and blood), misiraq ᒥᓯᕋᖅ (aged to resemble an aromatic white wine, made from seal or whale blubber), and nirukkaq ᓂᕈᒃᑲᖅ (a smooth made pâté made from the contents of a caribou's stomach).

Law
Inuit Nunangat currently functions through a variety of legal systems. As a Canadian jurisdiction, all of Inuit Nunangat falls under the federally overseen Criminal Code for criminal law. The regions within the three territories: Inuvialuit Nunangat in the Northwest Territories and Yukon, and Nunavut, are all subject to the English common law tradition. Nunavik, falling under the jurisdiction of Québec, follows the civil law tradition as it pertains to private law. Finally, Inuit largely still follow Inuit Qaujimajatuqangit traditions, recognizing the interconnected nature of reality.

Inuit Qaujimajatuqangit, ᐃᓄᐃᑦ ᖃᐅᔨᒪᔭᑐᖃᖏᑦ (alternatively rendered Qaujimanituqangit or Qauyimayatuqangit), comes from the root word qaujima- ᖃᐅᔨ meaning "to know," and could be literally translated as "that which has long been known by Inuit." Leaders and Elders did not see themselves as agents of social control or law and order, as each individual contributes to the functioning of the community. The integration of Inuit Qaujimajatuqangit (or IQ) and the wider Canadian legal tradition is an ongoing process. For example, the Nunavut Court of Justice is the only "unified," single-level court in Canada, and the court travels to communities every six weeks to two years. There are also on-the-land and contemporary healing circle programs administered.

References

External links
 Inuit Tapiriit Kanatami

Indigenous peoples in Atlantic Canada
Indigenous peoples in Northern Canada
Indigenous peoples of North America
History of indigenous peoples of North America
Hunter-gatherers of the Arctic
Hunter-gatherers of Canada
Hunter-gatherers of the United States
Nunangat
Indigenous peoples in the Arctic
Cultural regions